The 1968 Vanderbilt Commodores football team represented Vanderbilt University in the 1968 NCAA University Division football season. The Commodores were led by head coach Bill Pace in his second season and finished the season with a record of five wins, four losses and one tie (5–4–1 overall, 1–3–1 in the SEC).

Schedule

References

Vanderbilt
Vanderbilt Commodores football seasons
Vanderbilt Commodores football